David J. Barram (born December 27, 1943) is an American businessman who served as the United States Deputy Secretary of Commerce from 1993 to 1996 and as Administrator of the General Services Administration from 1996 to 2000.

References

External links

1943 births
Living people
United States Deputy Secretaries of Commerce
Administrators of the General Services Administration
California Democrats
Clinton administration personnel